Billy Gene Poe II (born April 26, 1964) is a former American football offensive lineman. He spent one season with the NFL's Cincinnati Bengals in 1987, and later played for several teams in the Arena Football League and NFL Europe. A four-year letterman at Morehead State from 1983 to 1986, Poe was induced to the Morehead State Hall of Fame in 1998.

References 

1964 births
Living people
People from Ironton, Ohio
Players of American football from Ohio
American football offensive linemen
Morehead State Eagles football players
Cincinnati Bengals players
Chicago Bruisers players
Frankfurt Galaxy players